Burning Daylight is a 1910 novel by Jack London.

Burning Daylight may also refer to:
 Burning Daylight: The Adventures of 'Burning Daylight' in Alaska, a 1914 American adventure film
 Burning Daylight: The Adventures of 'Burning Daylight' in Civilization, a 1914 American adventure film
 Burning Daylight (1920 film), a 1920 silent film drama
 Burning Daylight (1928 film), a 1928 silent dramatic action adventure film
 "Burning Daylight" (song), a 2023 song by Mia Nicolai and Dion Cooper

See also
 Burnin' Daylight, an American country music band